Hibbertia ferruginea is a species of flowering plant in the family Dilleniaceae and is endemic to the south-west of Western Australia. It is an erect or spreading shrub with linear, sessile leaves  and yellow flowers borne in leaf axils near the ends of branchlets with fifteen stamens in five groups surrounding the five carpels.

Description
There are fifteen stamens arranged in five groups around the five glabrous carpels, each carpel containing a single ovule. Flowering occurs from August to November.

Taxonnomy
Hibbertia ferruginea was first formally described in 1984 by Judy Wheeler in the journal Nuytsia from specimens collected near Busselton by Robert Royce in 1952. The specific epithet (ferruginea) means "rust-coloured" referring to the hairs on the sepals.

Distribution and habitat
This hibbertia grows in woodland or sandy heath from near Capel and Collie to near Busselton and Nannup, in the Jarrah Forest, Swan Coastal Plain and Warren biogeographic regions in the south-west of Western Australia.

Conservation status
Hibbertia ferruginea is classified as "not threatened" by the Government of Western Australia Department of Parks and Wildlife.

See also
List of Hibbertia species

References

ferruginea
Flora of Western Australia
Plants described in 1984